The 1941–42 Toronto Maple Leafs season was the club's 25th season in the NHL.  The Maple Leafs came off a very solid season in 1940–41, finishing with their second highest point total in club history, as they had a 28–14–6 record, earning 62 points, which was two fewer than the 1934–35 team accumulated; however, they lost to the Boston Bruins in the semi-finals, extending their Stanley Cup drought to nine seasons.

That drought was broken, however, when the Maple Leafs defeated the Detroit Red Wings in the 1942 Stanley Cup Finals, coming back after losing the first three games to win the Stanley Cup in seven games. They were the first team to come back from an 0–3 deficit to win a playoff series 4–3, and although it has happened in several playoff series since then, this remains the only time it has happened in a championship round.

Off-season
Before Smythe left to take up training with his 30th Battery, he signed up three rookies to the Maple Leafs: Bob Goldham, Ernie Dickens and John McCreedy. Lorne Carr's contract was purchased from the New York Americans. The final addition to the team was Pete Langelle, who made the team after playing part-time in previous seasons.

Regular season
Toronto got off to a quick start, winning 14 of their first 19 games, battling with the Boston Bruins and New York Rangers for top spot in the NHL.  A 4–7–3 slump in their next 14 games saw Toronto fall behind the Bruins and Rangers, however, the Leafs followed up their slump by posting a 7–1–0 record in their next 8 games, before dropping 5 of final 7 games to end the season.  Toronto finished the year with a record of 27–18–3, recording 57 points, and finishing in second place in the NHL, three points behind the first place New York Rangers.

The Leafs offense was led by Syl Apps, who despite missing 10 games to injuries, finished tied for the club lead in points with 41.  Gordie Drillon also finished with 41 points, and he scored a team best 23 goals, while Billy Taylor had a club high 26 assists.  Sweeney Schriner managed to join Drillon in the 20 goal club, as he managed to get 20 goals and earned 36 points.  Bucko McDonald led the Leafs blueline, recording 21 points, while Rudolph Kampman provided the team toughness, getting 67 penalty minutes.

In goal, Turk Broda got all the action, winning 27 games and posting a 2.76 GAA, along with earning 6 shutouts.

The Maple Leafs would open the playoffs against the best team in the league, the New York Rangers in a best of seven semi-final series.  The Leafs opened the series with a victory at Maple Leaf Gardens with a solid 3–1 win, then managed to go up two games by defeating the Rangers 4–2 at Madison Square Garden.  New York managed to take the third game, shutting out Toronto 3–0, however, the Leafs would go up 3–1 in the series, winning the fourth game 2–1 at home.  New York staved off elimination in the fifth game, holding off Toronto for a 3–1 win, however, the Leafs ended the series in the sixth game, hanging on for a 3–2 victory, and a spot in the Stanley Cup finals.

Toronto's opponent in the 1942 Stanley Cup Finals was the Detroit Red Wings, who finished the year with a weak 19–25–4 record, ending up in fifth in the league.  Detroit defeated the Montreal Canadiens and Boston Bruins to earn a spot in the finals.  The Wings surprised Toronto in the series opener, winning the game 3–2, then Detroit managed to take the second game by a 4–2 score to go home with a 2–0 series lead.  The Red Wings stayed hot, winning the third game at the Detroit Olympia 5–2, pushing the Leafs to the brink of elimination.  Toronto responded in the fourth game, narrowly defeating Detroit 4–3 to cut the Wings series lead to 3–1.  The Leafs returned home for the fifth game, and dominated Detroit, winning the game 9–3 and now were down 3–2 in the series.  Turk Broda stole the show in the sixth game, shutting out Detroit 3–0 to even the series up, and the Leafs completed their miracle comeback with a 3–1 victory in the seventh and deciding game in front of a record breaking crowd of over 16,000 fans to win the Stanley Cup for the fourth time in club history, and first time since the 1931–32 season. This comeback was never repeated in a Stanley Cup finals since.

Final standings

Record vs. opponents

Schedule and results

Playoffs

Toronto Maple Leafs 4, New York Rangers 2

Toronto Maple Leafs 4, Detroit Red Wings 3

Player statistics

Regular season
Scoring

Goaltending

Playoffs
Scoring

Goaltending

Awards and records
 Lady Byng Memorial Trophy:  Syl Apps
 Syl Apps, Toronto Maple Leafs, Centre, NHL First Team All-Star
 Turk Broda, Goaltender, NHL Second Team All-Star
 Gordie Drillon, Right Wing, NHL Second Team All-Star
 Bucko McDonald, Defence, NHL Second Team All-Star

The 1941–42 Toronto Maple Leafs were inducted into the Ontario Sports Hall of Fame in 2003.

Transactions
 October 8, 1941: Acquired Viv Allen and Glenn Brydson from the Brooklyn Americans for Phil McAtee and return of Peanuts O'Flaherty from a loan
 October 30, 1941: Traded Norman Mann to the Pittsburgh Hornets of the AHL for cash
 October 30, 1941: Acquired Lorne Carr from the Brooklyn Americans for the loan of Red Heron, loan of Gus Marker, loan of Nick Knott and cash
 February 2, 1942: Traded Jack Church to the Brooklyn Americans for cash
 March 6, 1942: Signed Free Agent Gaye Stewart

See also
 1941–42 NHL season

References

 
 National Hockey League Guide & Record Book 2007

Stanley Cup championship seasons
Toronto Maple Leafs seasons
Toronto
Toronto